, also known as  is a Japanese gravure model, adult actress, and Penthouse Pet. Starting out her career as an erotic model in 2007, Hase transitioned into being an AV idol in 2009 before basing herself the United States in 2012. She appeared in more than 500 adult films and is one of the very few Japanese AV stars that have switched over to the American AV industry.

Career
Hase was born on September 26, 1981 in Tokyo, Japan. She began her career as an erotic model, appearing in several nude DVDs, and even collaborating with others like Tanuki Roku and Go Arisue. In one such release, her naked breasts and private areas are shown to be covered by ropes. During these days, she already contacted major AV studios and teased of a potential adult film debut. As a gravure model, she was using the name  and was renamed  when she made her AV debut, but she eventually returned to using her last name, Hase. In September 2009, she won the sponsored award "Tinkle"（てぃんくる賞） at "1st SOD star Cinderella audition." and made her AV debut in December 2009, Actual Gravure Idol x AV Debut for the SOD create Studio.

She graduated from SOD in May 2010 and moved to Japan Home Video's "EROTICA" series. She also started to perform with other AV companies like Moodyz and Cross. On June 17, 2011, she reported on her blog that she passed as the second member of the idol unit OFA21. In December 2011, she appeared in an edition of Nikkan Sports. During her Japanese AV career she appeared in more than 200 adult films (including omnibus and a re-edited versions) from various studios.

On March 31, 2012, she announced on her blog that she would continue her career in the United States. In January 2013, she was chosen as the Penthouse Pet of the Month. While Hase attempted to maintain a crossover career by performing in both Japanese and American adult films, by 2014 she started to fully transition into the American scene performing with companies such as Brazzers, Evil Angel, Kink.com and Wicked Pictures. As of 2019, Hase appeared in more than 300 Western porn scenes and continues to be an active performer. In October, 2019 she appeared as the cover girl in the monthly issue of Hustler.

Hase currently lives in Los Angeles, US but maintains a strong connection to her home country and visits Japan whenever she can.

Personal life
In February 2019, Hase revealed that she was diagnosed with breast cancer in late 2018. She set up a GoFundMe campaign to raise  to undergo a bilateral mastectomy and reconstruction at the City of Hope National Medical Center in Los Angeles County, California. The campaign also covered all related expenses, as she was out of work for four months. Hase said she donated any leftover funds to the medical center.

References

External links

 

Japanese gravure idols
Penthouse Pets
Japanese female adult models
Japanese pornographic film actresses
Actresses from Tokyo
Japanese expatriates in the United States
1981 births
Living people